"I Don't Go Shopping" is a song written by Peter Allen and David Lasley originally recorded by Allen on his Bi-Coastal album released in 1980 by A&M Records. American R&B singer Patti LaBelle covered the song for her fourth studio album Released produced by Allen Tousaint and released by Epic in 1980. The song was issued as the second single, peaking at number 26 on the Hot Soul Singles chart in early 1981. She has performed the song since its release.

Critical reception 
Upon release, "I Don't Go Shopping" received positive reviews from music critics. Winston-Salem Chronicle wrote With "Released" "Labelle dips back into her Blue Bell days for some soul searching out and out blues like ''I Don't Go Shopping'". Cashbox praised LaBelle's vocal delivery writing she "turns to what she does best here, stone blues" and the production, describing it as "underscored by subdued string arrangements and a touch of brass. Male backup chorus at the close is an added bonus" and called it a "spirited B/C chart contender."

Peter Allen version 
The song was included on Allen's Bi-Coastal album and The Very Best of Peter Allen: The Boy from Down Under, a greatest hits album released in Australia in August 1992 by A&M Records.

Credits and personnel 
Credits are adapted from album's liner notes.

 Peter Allen - Lead Vocals & Acoustic Piano
 Peter Allen - Acoustic Piano
 David Foster - Keyboards
 Dave McDaniel - Bass
 Ralph Humphries - Drums
 Lon Price - Alto Saxophone
 Erich Bulling - String Arrangement
 David Foster - Producer

Cover versions 
The song was released by David Lasley on his Demos album. It was covered by Scottish singer Lulu in 1982 on her album Take Me to Your Heart Again.

References

External links 
 
 

1980 songs
1980 singles
Patti LaBelle songs
Songs written by David Lasley
Songs written by Peter Allen (musician)
Pop ballads